Rutabaga (rut) is the name of the gene encoding calcium-sensitive dependent adenylate cyclase in fruit flies.
Rutabaga has been implicated in a number of functions, including learning and memory, behavior, and cell communication. Its human homolog is ADCY1.

References

External links 
 Drosophila rutabaga - The Interactive Fly 

Drosophila melanogaster genes